Pedicularia decussata is a species of sea snail, a marine gastropod mollusk in the family Ovulidae, one of the families of cowry allies.

Distribution
 Caribbean Sea
 Cuba
 Gulf of Mexico

Description 
The maximum recorded shell length is 13 mm.

Habitat 
The minimum recorded depth is 49 m. The maximum recorded depth is 1170 m.

References

Pediculariinae
Gastropods described in 1855